Neon Wars is a one player arcade style abstract shooter created by American studio Blitwise Productions. Players pilot a ship in square-shaped field where enemy ships that the player must destroy while not being destroyed themselves by them randomly spawn, and attempt to survive as long as possible.  Visually, the game utilizes neon visuals, sharp contrasts, and bright colors. The game has a demo version, which includes only the first zone (level), the Blue Zone, and time-limited versions of the next two zones, Turquoise and Green. The "Deluxe" includes seven zones, a special mode called Level Challenge and more powerups.

See also
Pocket Tanks
Super DX-Ball

References

External links
Official website of the developer
Official website of the game

Shooter video games
Video games developed in the United States
Windows games
Windows-only games
2006 video games